Yu Jin (died September 221), courtesy name Wenze, was a Chinese military general serving under the warlord Cao Cao in the late Eastern Han dynasty of China. He joined Cao Cao in 192 around the start of the civil wars leading to the collapse of the dynasty, and fought in many of the campaigns which established the warlord's position as a central figure in that period. In 219, Yu Jin was tasked with leading forces to relief Cao Cao's general Cao Ren, who was being besieged in Fancheng by Liu Bei's general Guan Yu, but his armies were destroyed in a flood due to heavy rains. Yu Jin surrendered to Guan Yu and became a prisoner-of-war, but was transferred to the custody of another warlord, Sun Quan, after Sun Quan's forces captured Guan Yu's bases in late 219. Sun Quan treated Yu Jin like a guest and in 221 sent him back to the state of Cao Wei, which was founded in late 220 by Cao Cao's successor, Cao Pi, who ended the Eastern Han dynasty. Cao Pi pardoned Yu Jin and restored him to the position of a general. However, Yu Jin died later that year in regret after visiting Cao Cao's tomb, where he saw illustrations of the Battle of Fancheng depicting his surrender to Guan Yu.

Chen Shou, who wrote the third-century historical text Sanguozhi, named Yu Jin as one of the Five Elite Generals of his time, alongside Zhang He, Yue Jin, Zhang Liao and Xu Huang.

Early career
Yu Jin was born in Juping County, Taishan Commandery, which is in present-day Tai'an, Shandong, in the late Eastern Han dynasty. In the early 180s, when the Yellow Turban Rebellion broke out, Yu Jin responded to the Han government's call for volunteers to serve in the imperial army and help to suppress the revolt. He became a subordinate of the general Bao Xin, who was based in Yan Province (covering present-day southwestern Shandong and eastern Henan).

In 192, after the warlord Cao Cao took charge of Yan Province, Yu Jin and his fellow volunteers were appointed as doubos (都伯; an officer leading 100 men) and placed under the command of Wang Lang. Wang Lang felt that Yu Jin was extraordinary and had the potential to become a great general, so he recommended Yu Jin to Cao Cao. Cao Cao commissioned Yu Jin as a Major after interviewing him, and then sent him to attack Guangwei, a location in Xu Province, which was governed by Tao Qian. Yu Jin successfully conquered Guangwei and was promoted to Commandant Who Breaks Formations.

Battles against Lü Bu, Yellow Turban remnants and Yuan Shu

Between 194 and 195, Yu Jin fought on Cao Cao's side in a war against a rival warlord Lü Bu for control over Yan Province. He destroyed two of Lü Bu's camps at the south of the city during a battle in Puyang while his subordinates defeated Gao Ya, one of Lü Bu's officers, at Xuchang (須昌; northeast of present-day Dongping County, Shandong).

Yu Jin later attacked Lü Bu's strongholds at Shouzhang (壽張; southwest of present-day Dongping County, Shandong), Dingtao (定陶; present-day Dingtao County, Shandong) and Lihu (離狐; southeast of present-day Puyang, Henan) counties, and captured all of them. He also besieged Zhang Chao at Yongqiu (雍丘; present-day Qi County, Henan) and conquered the county.

Around 196, Yu Jin joined Cao Cao in a campaign against remnants of the Yellow Turban rebels led by Liu Pi, Huang Shao and others. They garrisoned at Banliang. One night, Huang Shao and the rebels attempted to launch a surprise attack on Cao Cao's camp, but were defeated by Yu Jin and his subordinates. Liu Pi, Huang Shao and the rebel leaders were killed and the remaining rebels surrendered. Yu Jin was promoted to Colonel Who Pacifies the Barbarians.

In 197, Yu Jin besieged Qiao Rui, an officer serving under a rival warlord Yuan Shu, at Ku County (苦縣; present-day Luyi County, Henan) and killed Qiao Rui and four other enemy officers.

Battles against Zhang Xiu, Lü Bu and Sui Gu

In 197, Yu Jin accompanied Cao Cao on a campaign against the warlord Zhang Xiu in Wancheng (宛城; present-day Wancheng District, Nanyang, Henan). Zhang Xiu initially surrendered and pledged allegiance to Cao Cao, but rebelled later and defeated Cao Cao in a surprise attack. There was chaos and disorder in Cao Cao's forces as they retreated to Wuyin County (舞陰縣; southeast of present-day Sheqi County, Henan).

Only Yu Jin led his unit to continue fighting the pursuing enemy while maintaining an orderly retreat to Wuyin County. They managed to stay together even though they had sustained many casualties and losses. When Zhang Xiu's forces slowed down on their pursuit, Yu Jin reorganised his men and led them towards Wuyin County in a dignified manner even though they had lost the battle.

Before reaching Cao Cao's position, Yu Jin encountered about a dozen injured and naked men on the road. When he asked them what happened, they told him that they were robbed by the Qingzhou Corps. Yu Jin turned furious and said: "The Qingzhou Corps are part of Lord Cao's army. How dare they become robbers!" He then led his men to attack and punish them. Some of the Qingzhou soldiers escaped to Wuyin County and accused Yu Jin of committing the crimes they were responsible for.

When Yu Jin reached Wuyin County, he immediately set up defensive fortifications around the camp instead of reporting directly to Cao Cao. His subordinates told him: "The Qingzhou soldiers framed you. You should explain matters to Lord Cao as soon as possible." Yu Jin replied: "The enemy is still in pursuit and may reach here anytime. If we don't set up defences now, how can we expect to hold them off? Lord Cao is intelligent and wise. Those accusations aren't a cause for concern."

After the defences were set up, Yu Jin went to meet Cao Cao and explained everything. Cao Cao felt pleased and he said, "How dangerous it was for me when we were defeated at the Yu River. General, you're able to bring order to chaos and hold your ground against a fierce enemy, and you display unwavering loyalty. Even the famous generals of ancient times couldn't have done better than you!" Yu Jin was awarded the title "Marquis of Yishou Village" in recognition of his contributions.

In 198, Yu Jin followed Cao Cao on another campaign against Zhang Xiu at Rang County (穰縣; or Rangcheng 穰城, in present-day Dengzhou, Henan). He also participated in the Battle of Xiapi against Lü Bu, which resulted in Lü Bu's defeat and execution. Later, he joined Shi Huan and Cao Ren in defeating Sui Gu at Shequan County (射犬縣; present-day Qinyang, Henan).

Guandu campaign

In early 200, when war broke out between Cao Cao and his northern rival Yuan Shao, with the latter initially having the upper hand, Yu Jin volunteered to lead the vanguard to engage Yuan Shao's forces. Cao Cao was impressed with Yu Jin's courage, so he placed Yu Jin in command of 2,000 infantry and cavalry and ordered him to defend Yan Ford (延津; in present-day Yanjin County, Henan) from the enemy, while he personally led another army to Guandu (官渡; northeast of present-day Zhongmu County, Henan).

Around the time, the warlord Liu Bei seized control of Xu Province after killing Che Zhou, the provincial governor whom Cao Cao had appointed. Cao Cao then led his forces to attack Liu Bei. Yuan Shao concurrently attacked Yan Ford, but Yu Jin managed to hold his position.

Later, Yu Jin and Yue Jin led 5,000 infantry and cavalry to attack Yuan Shao's camps along the Yellow River southwest of Yan Ford. They travelled to as far as Ji (汲; southwest of present-day Weihui, Henan) and Huojia (獲嘉; southeast of present-day Huojia County, Henan) counties. They set fire to over 30 enemy camps, killed or captured thousands of enemy soldiers, and forced over 20 of Yuan Shao's officers, including He Mao and Wang Mo, into surrendering. Cao Cao then ordered Yu Jin to garrison at Yuanwu County (原武縣; present-day Yuanyang County, Henan). Yu Jin attacked and destroyed Yuan Shao's camp at Dushi Ford.

Yu Jin was promoted to Major-General for his achievement and was then relocated to Cao Cao's camp at Guandu. During the Battle of Guandu, Yuan Shao's forces piled up earth to form small hills and constructed platforms on top for their archers, who rained arrows on Cao Cao's camp. Cao Cao's forces sustained many casualties and the soldiers were all fearful. Yu Jin firmly defended his positions, fought bravely, and displayed great fervour. He was promoted to Lieutenant-General after Cao Cao scored a decisive victory over Yuan Shao at Guandu.

Suppressing two rebellions
Cao Cao continued waging wars against Yuan Shao after the Battle of Guandu and against Yuan Shao's heirs and allies after Yuan Shao died in 202. By 206, after he had seized control of Ji Province (covering parts of present-day southern Hebei) from the Yuans, a minor warlord Chang Xi who had initially surrendered to him in early 201 rebelled against him. Cao Cao ordered Yu Jin to lead an army to attack Chang Xi. Chang Xi surrendered to Yu Jin, who was an old friend of his.

When his subordinates suggested that he send Chang Xi as a prisoner-of-war to Cao Cao and let Cao Cao decide Chang Xi's fate, Yu Jin said: "Aren't you all aware of the norms established by Lord Cao? He doesn't spare those who surrender after they are surrounded. I should follow his norms and uphold law and order. Chang Xi may be an old friend of mine, but I won't break the norms because of this!" He personally supervised Chang Xi's execution and shed tears as he gave the order.

When Cao Cao heard about it, he remarked: "Is it Heaven's will that Chang Xi had his fate decided by Yu Jin instead of me?" He regarded Yu Jin more highly than before after this incident. Yu Jin was promoted to General of Tiger's Might for his efforts in pacifying Chang Xi's revolt.

In 209, after the Battle of Red Cliffs, Chen Lan and Mei Cheng started a rebellion in Lu County (六縣; present-day Lu'an, Anhui). Cao Cao sent two separate forces to suppress the rebellion: Yu Jin and Zang Ba to attack Mei Cheng; Zhang Liao, with Zhang He and Niu Gai as his deputies, to attack Chen Lan. Mei Cheng and his followers, who numbered about 3,000, surrendered when Yu Jin and Zang Ba showed up.

However, after Yu Jin and Zang Ba left, Mei Cheng rebelled again and led his men to join Chen Lan. Zhang Liao led his army to attack the rebels, but was running short of supplies, so Yu Jin headed back and oversaw the transporting of supplies to the frontline to support Zhang Liao. Zhang Liao successfully suppressed the revolt and killed the two rebel leaders.

In recognition of his contributions during the campaign, Yu Jin was awarded an additional 200 taxable households in his marquisate, making it 1,200 households in total. Later, he was promoted to General of the Left and granted imperial authority. One of his sons was awarded a marquis title and given 500 households in his marquisate.

Battle of Fancheng

In 219, when Cao Cao was in Chang'an, he gave orders to his general Cao Ren to attack Liu Bei's general Guan Yu at Fancheng (樊城; present-day Fancheng District, Xiangyang, Hubei). He also instructed Yu Jin to lead forces to support Cao Ren.

It was in autumn at the time and there were heavy rains. The Han River overflowed and flooded the neighbouring flat lands. The water level reached as high as several zhang. Yu Jin's seven armies were destroyed in the flood, while Yu Jin himself and his remaining men managed to escape to high ground and were trapped there.

Guan Yu led naval troops to attack Yu Jin. Yu Jin surrendered to Guan Yu, but his subordinate Pang De put up fierce resistance and ended up being captured and executed by Guan Yu when he refused to surrender.

When Cao Cao received news of Yu Jin's surrender, he mourned Pang De's death for a long time and said, "I've known Yu Jin for 30 years, yet the behaviour he displayed in the face of danger was no better than that displayed by Pang De!"

Later life and death
Yu Jin remained as a prisoner-of-war in Guan Yu's base in Jing Province until late 219, when Liu Bei's territories in the province were captured by Sun Quan's general Lü Meng in a stealth invasion. Guan Yu was captured and executed by Sun Quan's forces. Yu Jin was released and brought to Wu (Sun Quan's domain), where he was treated like a guest. However, he was also ridiculed and humiliated by Yu Fan, an official serving under Sun Quan.

Cao Cao died in March 220 and was succeeded by his son Cao Pi. Later that year, Cao Pi ended the Eastern Han dynasty and established the state of Cao Wei with him as its first emperor. Sun Quan pledged allegiance to Cao Pi in 221 and sent Yu Jin back to Wei in autumn.

By then, Yu Jin was a pallid-looking old man with a head full of grey hair. He knelt down, kowtowed and cried when he met Cao Pi. Cao Pi comforted him, told him about Xun Linfu and Mengmingshi, and then commissioned him as General Who Stabilises Distant Lands.

Cao Pi wanted to send Yu Jin as his personal representative to meet Sun Quan. Before Yu Jin left, Cao Pi ordered him to visit Cao Cao's tomb at Gaoling in Ye (in present-day Handan, Hebei). There, Yu Jin saw illustrations of the Battle of Fancheng, in which he was depicted surrendering to Guan Yu, while Pang De was portrayed in a ferocious and courageous manner. He was so filled with regret that he fell ill, and then died. Cao Pi granted him the posthumous title "Marquis Li", which literally means "severe marquis".

Family
Yu Jin's son, Yu Gui, inherited his father's title "Marquis of Yishou Village". Yu Jin probably had at least one other son, who received a marquis title and 500 households in his marquisate.

Appraisal
Chen Shou, who wrote Yu Jin's biography in the Records of the Three Kingdoms (Sanguozhi), named Yu one of the Five Elite Generals of his time, alongside Zhang Liao, Yue Jin, Zhang He and Xu Huang. He mentioned that when Cao Cao went to war, these five generals were usually in command of either the vanguard (when making offensives) or the rear guard (when retreating). Yu Jin was known for maintaining high standards of discipline in his unit and for never keeping the spoils of war for himself. As such, he was often awarded a large share of rewards after battles. However, he was very unpopular with his men because he was harsh and unforgiving in enforcing rules and regulations.

Cao Cao disliked Zhu Ling, one of his generals, and had the intention of removing him from his position. He knew that Yu Jin had an intimidating presence so he ordered Yu Jin to take control of Zhu Ling's unit. Zhu Ling and his men did not dare to move when Yu Jin showed up at their camp and took over Zhu Ling's command. Zhu Ling then became Yu Jin's subordinate and all his men obediently submitted to Yu Jin's command. Such was Yu Jin's ability to strike fear into the hearts of others.

Pei Songzhi, who annotated Yu Jin's biography in the Sanguozhi, commented that even though Yu Jin followed the book when he executed Chang Xi (who surrendered after being surrounded), he had another option – send Chang Xi as a prisoner-of-war to Cao Cao and let his lord decide Chang Xi's fate – that was still not considered a violation of the norms. Pei Songzhi felt that Yu Jin deserved his eventual fate – ending up as a prisoner-of-war and receiving a negative-sounding posthumous title ("severe marquis") after death – because he was unwilling to make an exception for an old friend, was inclined towards killing, and was harsh in suppressing dissent.

The Song dynasty poet Kong Pingzhong (孔平仲;  11th–12 centuries) wrote a poem "General Yu" describing Yu Jin's life:

See also
 Five Elite Generals
 Lists of people of the Three Kingdoms

Notes

References

Citations

Bibliography
 Chen, Shou (3rd century). Records of the Three Kingdoms (Sanguozhi).
 
 Pei, Songzhi (5th century). Annotations to Records of the Three Kingdoms (Sanguozhi zhu).
 
 Yi Zhou Shu.

Year of birth unknown
221 deaths
Cao Wei generals
Generals under Cao Cao
Han dynasty generals from Shandong
People from Tai'an